Fred Turnbull may refer to:

 Fred Turnbull (footballer, born 1946), English footballer for Aston Villa
 Fred Turnbull (footballer, born 1888) (1888–1959), English footballer for Coventry City and Southampton 
 Fred Turnbull (Australian footballer) (1884–1947), Australian rules footballer